George Stetter (born April 29, 1945) was a Canadian football player who played for the Montreal Alouettes and Ottawa Rough Riders. He won the Grey Cup in 1968 with Ottawa. He previously played college football at the University of Virginia.

References

1945 births
Living people
Ottawa Rough Riders players
Montreal Alouettes players
Canadian football defensive backs
Virginia Cavaliers football players
American football defensive backs
Players of American football from New Jersey
American players of Canadian football